Hypolycaena vanavasa is a butterfly in the family Lycaenidae. It was described by Hans Fruhstorfer in 1909. It is found in Taiwan.

References

Butterflies described in 1909
Hypolycaenini